The 1890 Syracuse Stars baseball team finished with a 55–72 record, seventh place in the American Association during their only season in Major League baseball. They had previously played in the International Association in 1888 and 1889.

Regular season

Season standings

Record vs. opponents

Opening Day lineup

Notable transactions 
 August 16, 1890: Rasty Wright was released by the Stars.

Roster

Player stats

Batting

Starters by position 
Note: Pos = Position; G = Games played; AB = At bats; H = Hits; Avg. = Batting average; HR = Home runs; RBI = Runs batted in

Other batters 
Note: G = Games played; AB = At bats; H = Hits; Avg. = Batting average; HR = Home runs; RBI = Runs batted in

Pitching

Starting pitchers 
Note: G = Games pitched; IP = Innings pitched; W = Wins; L = Losses; ERA = Earned run average; SO = Strikeouts

Other pitchers 
Note: G = Games pitched; IP = Innings pitched; W = Wins; L = Losses; ERA = Earned run average; SO = Strikeouts

Relief pitchers 
Note: G = Games pitched; W = Wins; L = Losses; SV = Saves; ERA = Earned run average; SO = Strikeouts

Notes

References 
 1890 Syracuse Stars team page at Baseball Reference

Syracuse Stars season
1890